Dębiny Osuchowskie  is a village in the administrative district of Gmina Mszczonów, within Żyrardów County, Masovian Voivodeship, in east-central Poland.

The village has a population of 20. It has a gravel pit that had been abandoned for many years before the exploitation works began again in 2008. Also the source of the Jeziorka River is located here.

References

Villages in Żyrardów County